= PlaceNigde poetry festival =

Coordinates: 56°28′10″N 84°56′51″E

The PlaceNigde Poetry Festival (Russian: ПлясНигде or PlaceНигде) is moveable poetry festival that has been established in May 2012. It takes place in Tomsk. The motto of the festival is "A place for poetry is everywhere and nowhere".
